Aston Villa Football Club are an English professional association football club based in Aston, Birmingham, who currently play in the Premier League. The club was founded in 1874 and were founding members of the Football League in 1888, as well as the Premier League in 1992. They are one of the oldest football clubs in England, having won the First Division Championship seven times and the FA Cup seven times. In 1982, the club became one of only five English clubs to win the European Cup.

This list encompasses the honours won by Aston Villa and the records set by the players and the club. The player records section includes details of the club's leading goalscorers and those who have made the most appearances in first-team competitions. Attendance records at Villa Park are also included in the list.

Honours 

Aston Villa have won honours both domestically and in European cup competitions. Their most recent domestic honour was a League Cup win in 1996.

European 
 European Cup:
 Winners (1): 1982

 European Super Cup:	
 Winners (1): 1982–83

 Intertoto Cup:

 Winners (1): 2001
 Co-winners (1): 2008

Domestic

League 
 Football League First Division:
 Winners (7): 1894, 1896, 1897, 1899, 1900, 1910, 1981
 Runners up (9): 1889, 1903, 1908, 1911, 1913, 1914, 1931, 1933, 1990
 Premier League:
 Runners up (1): 1993
 Football League Second Division:
 Winners (2): 1938, 1960
 Runners up (2): 1975, 1988
Play-Offs (1): 2019
 Football League Third Division:
 Winners (1): 1972

Cups 
 FA Cup*
 Winners (7): 1887, 1895, 1897, 1905, 1913, 1920, 1957
 Runners up (4): 1892, 1924, 2000, 2015
 Football League Cup: Winners (5): 1961, 1975, 1977, 1994, 1996
 Runners up (4): 1963, 1971, 2010, 2020
 FA Charity Shield
 Winners (1): 1981 (shared)
 Runners up (3): 1910, 1957, 1972
Sheriff of London Charity Shield: 
 Winners (2): 1899, 1901
 Runners up (1): 1900
Football League War Cup
 Winners (1): 1944

Youth
FA Youth Cup:
 Winners (4): 1972, 1980, 2002, 2021
FA Premier League Cup
 Winners (1): 2018
HKFC Soccer Sevens
Winners (6): 2002, 2004, 2007, 2008, 2010, 2016
 NextGen Cup:
 Winners (1): 2013

Friendly and exhibition
Football World Championship
 Winners (3): 1887, 1894, 1900 (shared) 
Bass Charity Vase
 Winners (3): 1893, 1894, 2018
Dublin Tournament
 Winners (1): 2003
Peace Cup:
 Winners (1): 2009
Cup of Traditions
Winners (1): 2017
Queensland Champions Cup
Winners (1): 2022
Al Wahda Challenge Cup
Winners (1): 2022

Player records

Appearances 
 Youngest first-team player: Jimmy Brown, 15 years 349 days (v. Bolton Wanderers, Division Two, 17 September 1969).
 Oldest first-team player: Brad Friedel, 40 years 4 days (v. Liverpool, Premier League, 22 May 2011).

Most appearances 
Competitive matches only. Each column contains appearances in the starting eleven, followed by appearances as substitute in brackets.

Other competitions include European Cup, UEFA Cup and Intertoto Cup

Goalscorers 
 Most goals in a season: Tom 'Pongo' Waring, 50 goals in 1930–31 season.
 Most league goals in a season: Tom 'Pongo' Waring, 49 goals in 1930–31 season.
 In the 1899–1900 season Billy Garraty became the top goalscorer in world football scoring 27 goals in just 33 league games and a total 30 goals in 39 league and cup games.
 Most consecutive matches scored in: Len Capewell, 8 games, 1925–26 season.

Top goalscorers 
Competitive matches only, appearances including substitutes appear in brackets.

International 
This section refers only to caps won while an Aston Villa player.
 First capped players for England: Arthur Alfred Brown and Howard Vaughton on 18 February 1882.
 Most capped international player: Olof Mellberg, 69 caps for Sweden between July 2001 and July 2008.
 Most capped player for England: Gareth Southgate, 42 caps.
 First player to play at the World Cup finals: Peter McParland for Northern Ireland against Czechoslovakia on 8 June 1958.
 First player to score at the World Cup finals: Peter McParland for Northern Ireland against Argentina on 11 June 1958.
 First player to score in a World Cup for England: David Platt for England against Belgium on 26 June 1990.
 Most World Cup appearances: Paul McGrath, 9 (1990 and 1994), Steve Staunton, 8 (1994 and 2002), Olof Mellberg, 8 (2002 and 2006).
 Most successful players at the World Cup: 
Winner: Emi Martínez (2022). 
3rd Place: Alpay Özalan (2002), Ron Vlaar (2014).
4th Place: David Platt (1990).
 Most World Cup finals goals: Peter McParland, 5 (1958).

Record transfer fees

This section lists the record transfer fees paid by the club for a player. The highest transfer fee received by the club is the £100 million fee paid by Manchester City for Jack Grealish in August 2021. The sale at the time was a British transfer record. The highest initial fee Aston Villa have ever paid for a player was £33 million, rising to £38 million with add-ons, for Argentinian midfielder Emiliano Buendía from Norwich City in June 2021.

Fees Paid 
Fees Received

Managerial records 

 First manager/secretary of the club: George Ramsay, in charge of 1327 games from August 1884 to 5 May 1926.
 Longest serving manager: George Ramsay.
 Most successful manager: George Ramsay, 6 League Championships and 6 FA Cups.

Club records

Goals 
 Most league goals scored in a season: 128 (in 42 matches in the 1930–31 season, Division One).
 Fewest league goals scored in a season: 27 goals (in 38 matches in the 2015–16 season, Premier League).
 Most league goals conceded in a season: 110 goals (in 42 matches in the 1935–36 season, Division One).
 Fewest league goals conceded in a season: 32 goals (in 46 matches in the 1971–72 season, Division Three).

Points 
 Most points in a season:
 Two points for a win: 70 points (in 46 matches in the 1971–72 season, Division Three).
 Three points for a win: 83 points (in 46 matches in the 2017–18 season, Championship).
 Fewest points in a season:
 Two points for a win:
 18 points (in 22 matches in the 1890–91 season, Division One).
 29 points (in 42 matches in the 1966–67 season, Division One / 1969–70 season, Division Two).
 Three points for a win:
 17 points (in 38 matches in the 2015–16, Premier League).

Matches

Firsts 
 First match: Aston Villa 1–0 Aston Brook St Mary's, March 1874.
 First league match: Wolverhampton Wanderers 1–1 Aston Villa, 8 September 1888.
 First match at Villa Park: friendly; 3–0, Blackburn Rovers, on 17 April 1897.
 First FA Cup match: Stafford Road Works 1–1 Aston Villa, 13 December 1879. Aston Villa won the replay 3–1 on 24 January 1880.
 First League Cup match: Aston Villa 4–1 Huddersfield Town, 12 October 1960.
 First European match: Royal Antwerp 4–1 Aston Villa, 17 September 1975, UEFA Cup.

Record wins 
 Record Football League win: 12–2 (v. Accrington, 12 March 1892).
 Record Premier League win: 7–1 (v. Wimbledon, 11 February 1995).
 Record FA Cup win: 13–0 (v. Wednesbury Old Athletic, 1st round, 3 October 1886).
 Record League Cup win: 8–1 (v. Exeter City, 2nd round, 9 October 1985).
 Record European win: 5–0 (v. Valur in the European Cup, 16 September 1981 and v. Vitória de Guimarães in the UEFA Cup, 28 September 1983).

Record defeats 
 Record defeat: 0–8 (v. Chelsea, Premier League, 23 December 2012).
 Record FA Cup defeat: 1–8 (v. Blackburn Rovers, 3rd round, 16 February 1889).
 Record League Cup defeat: 1–6 (v. West Bromwich Albion, 2nd round, 14 September 1966).
 Record European defeat: 1–4 (v. Royal Antwerp, 1st round UEFA Cup, 17 September 1975).<ref
name=Ward273>Ward, Adam; Griffin, Jeremy; p.273</ref>

Attendances 
 Highest attendance at Villa Park:
 League game: 69,492 (v. Wolverhampton Wanderers, 27 December 1949).
 FA Cup game: 76,588 (v. Derby County, sixth round, 2 March 1946).
 As an all-seater stadium: 42,788 (v. Manchester United, 10 February 2010).
 Lowest attendance at Villa Park:
 League game: 2,900 (v. Bradford City, Division One, 13 February 1915).
Highest attendance at Wellington Road:
League game: 20,000 (v. Sunderland, 5 October 1895; v. Everton, 26 September 1896).
FA Cup game: 26,849 (v. Preston North End, fifth round, 7 January 1888).
Lowest attendance at Wellington Road
League game: 600 (v. Accrington, 27 October 1888).

Streaks 

 Longest winning runs (consecutive wins) : 
Multiple competitions: 11 games in the 1896–97 Football League, 1897–98 Football League and 1896–97 FA Cup (20 March – 18 September 1897)
League: 10 games (2018–19 EFL Championship: 2 March 2019 – 22 April 2019)
 Longest unbeaten runs (without loss):
Multiple competitions: 22 games in the 1896–97 Football League, 1897–98 Football League, and 1896–97 FA Cup (16 January 1897 – 18 September 1897)
 League matches: 
13 games in the 1898–99 Football League (17 September 1898 – 24 December 1898)
13 games in the 2008-09 Premier League (9 November 2008 – 21 February 2009)
 Longest losing run (consecutive losses):
11 games (1962–63 Football League: 23 March 1963 – 20 April 1963); (2015–16 Premier League: 14 February 2016 – 30 April 2016)
 Longest run without a league win:
 19 games (2015–16 Premier League: 14 August 2015 – 12 January 2016)
 Longest run without a win in all competitions:
 16 games (2015–16 Premier League, 2015–16 FA Cup, 2015-16 Football League Cup: 22 September 2015 – 12 January 2016)

National records  
Most League Cup matches played (252) and won (148)
 All-Time record for the most top-flight goals scored in a season, scoring 128 in season 1930–31.
 First football club in the world to appoint a paid manager, George Ramsay in 1886.
 First top-flight club to appoint a manager from outside the British Isles, Jozef Vengloš in July 1990.
 Villa Park was the first English stadium to stage international football in three different centuries.
 Villa Park has hosted more FA Cup Semi-Finals than any other ground, 55 to date.
 Highest FA Cup attendance (pre-World War I): 121,919 (Aston Villa vs Sunderland, Final at Crystal Palace, 19 April 1913)
 First football club to have a player score in every round of the FA Cup, when captain Archie Hunter led the club to its first FA Cup trophy in 1887.
 First football club to pay more than £100 for a player, for Willie Groves in 1893.
 First English football club to have a Black player on the scoresheet in the English Football League, when Willie Clarke scored on Christmas Day 1901, in a 3–2 victory over Everton.
First English club to have a player score a hat-trick of penalty kicks in a league match, Billy Walker doing so in a 7–1 win against Bradford City in November 1921.
 First football club to have a player win both the PFA Young Player of the Year and PFA Players' Player of the Year in the same season, Andy Gray in 1976–77.

Aston Villa in UEFA competitions 
Below is Aston Villa's record in European and Intercontinental competitions sanctioned by UEFA. As of December 2022, they are one of only five English clubs to have won the European Cup, which they did in 1982. Aston Villa's scores are noted first in both results columns.

Key
 2QR = Second Qualifying Round
 P/O = Play-off Round
 1R = First Round
 2R = Second Round
 3R = Third Round
 GS = Group Stages
 R32 = Round of 32
 QF = Quarter-Finals
 SF = Semi-Finals
 F = Final

Record by competition
Correct as of May 2011

Footnotes 

A.  The Premier League took over from the First Division as the top tier of the English football league system upon its formation in 1992. The First Division then became the second tier of English football, the Second Division became the third tier, and so on. The First Division is now known as the Football League Championship, while the Second Division is now known as Football League One.
B In 1981, the Charity Shield was shared in the event of a draw.
C Aston Villa won their 3rd round, final tie of the 2008 Intertoto Cup and were named a co-winner of the tournament, as a result they qualified for the 2008-09 UEFA Cup. The outright winner of the Intertoto Cup was the team that progressed furthest in the UEFA Cup that season, which was SC Braga.
D The home team are listed first.

References 
Specific

General

External links 
 
 
 
 

Records And Statistics
Aston Villa